The Mexican Roller Hockey Championship is the biggest Roller Hockey Clubs Championship in Mexico.

Participated teams in the last season
 Jaguares
 All Blacks, Aztecas
 Gallos Negros Querétaro
 Lobos BUAP
 Patin San Luis

List of winners

Number of championships by team

External links

Mexican websites
 Unofficial Mexican Roller Hockey Association
 Website about Mexican Hockey
 Blog about Mexican Hockey
 (https://www.facebook.com/javier.alonzo.1671)

International
  Roller Hockey links worldwide
  Mundook-World Roller Hockey
 rink-hockey-news - World Roller Hockey

Roller hockey in Mexico
M
Mexico